Malcolm De Sousa is an international lawn bowler from Jersey.

Bowls career
De Sousa represented Jersey at the 2010 Commonwealth Games, the 2014 Commonwealth Games and the 2018 Commonwealth Games

In 2011 he won singles and pairs bronze medals at the Atlantic Bowls Championships and in 2019 he won the fours silver medal at the Atlantic Bowls Championships.

De Sousa has won two British titles, winning the fours in 2016 and pairs in 2019 at the British Isles Bowls Championships. In 2020 he was selected for the 2020 World Outdoor Bowls Championship in Australia.

In October 2021, De Sousa was selected to represent Jersey in the 2022 Commonwealth Games being held in Birmingham. He duly competed in the men's triples and the men's fours at the 2022 Commonwealth Games.

References

Jersey bowls players
Living people
1991 births
Bowls players at the 2010 Commonwealth Games
Bowls players at the 2014 Commonwealth Games
Bowls players at the 2018 Commonwealth Games
Bowls players at the 2022 Commonwealth Games